Leanne Schuster McSorley (born February 7, 1973) is an American indoor volleyball and beach volleyball player.  Leanne graduated from Arizona State University in 1995 with a degree in Business Management.  While at ASU, she was a two-time second team Academic All-Pac-10 selection. Leanne married former professional hockey player Marty McSorley in August 2002.  She is the youngest of seven children, with four sisters and two brothers.

Professional career
Teamed with Carrie Busch to win the BVA Hermosa Beach event in 2000. Her best international finish was a third in the 2000 season finale in Brazil with Nancy Mason. She was a four-year letterman in volleyball at Arizona State where she earned All-League and All-Region honors and is listed among the school's all-time leaders in several statistics. Was a member of the 1992 Olympic Festival championship team.

References

1973 births
Living people
American women's volleyball players
Arizona State Sun Devils women's volleyball players
Arizona State Sun Devils women's beach volleyball players